Sharon Donnelly (born July 29, 1967 in Toronto, Ontario) is an athlete from Canada, who competed in triathlon (1.5-km swim, 40-km cycle, 10-km run).

Donnelly graduated from the Royal Military College of Canada in 1990, (17324) with a B.A. (Commerce), and served as an Army Logistics Officer for 5 years. She won the gold medal at the 1999 Pan American Games in Winnipeg, Manitoba, Canada.

To pursue a spot on the 2000 Olympic team, Donnelly transferred to the Reserves in 1995 and competed at the first Olympic triathlon at the 2000 Summer Olympics. She took thirty-eighth place with a total time of 2:14:35.59. She continued racing with an aim of making a second Olympic team in 2004 but missed inclusion by 22 seconds. She was a Team Alternate for Athens 2004 Olympics.

In the fall of 2004, Donnelly retired from the sport and the Reserves. She was Race Director for the inaugural Canadian Forces Base triathlon in Kingston, Ontario in May 2004. She taught physical education at Saint Lawrence College, and coached local junior, age group triathletes.

Since moving to Colorado Springs in 2006, Donnelly has worked at the United States Olympic Training Centre as assistant National Triathlon Team coach.

External links
 SharonDonnelly.com
 Sharon Donnely Bio

1967 births
Living people
Canadian female triathletes
Sportspeople from Toronto
Triathletes at the 1999 Pan American Games
Triathletes at the 2000 Summer Olympics
Triathlon people from Ontario
Triathletes at the 2002 Commonwealth Games
Commonwealth Games competitors for Canada
Pan American Games gold medalists for Canada
Pan American Games medalists in triathlon
Olympic triathletes of Canada
Medalists at the 1999 Pan American Games
21st-century Canadian women